Gavin Byron Stevens (born 29 February 1932 in Glenelg, South Australia) is a former Australian cricketer who played in four Tests in the 1959–60 season.

An opening batsman, Stevens made his debut for South Australia in 1952–53. He scored consistently in the Sheffield Shield in 1956–57, 1957–58, and in 1958–59, when he made 951 runs in the season at 59.43 with three centuries. In December 1958, against New South Wales in Sydney, he made 57 and 259 not out.

Stevens was selected for Australia's tour to Pakistan and India in 1959-60 and played two Tests in each country with a top score of 28 against Pakistan in Karachi, before contracting a severe case of hepatitis. Although he recovered, he never played first-class cricket again.

His older brother Bob was an amateur golfer who won the Australian Amateur in 1952.

References

External links
 Gavin Stevens at Cricket Archive
 Gavin Stevens at Cricinfo

1932 births
Living people
Australia Test cricketers
South Australia cricketers
Australian cricketers
Cricketers from Adelaide